Patricia Schwager (born 6 December 1983) is a Swiss racing cyclist. She competed in the 2012 UCI women's road race in Valkenburg aan de Geul and in the 2013 UCI women's road race in Florence.

See also
2009 Cervélo TestTeam (women) season

References

External links

1983 births
Living people
Swiss female cyclists
Cyclists from Zürich
21st-century Swiss women